Rhineland-Palatinate is a western state of Germany. It is the ninth largest and sixth most populous of the sixteen states. Mainz is the capital and largest city. Other cities are Ludwigshafen am Rhein, Koblenz, Trier, Kaiserslautern, Worms and Neuwied. It is bordered by North Rhine-Westphalia, Saarland, Baden-Württemberg and Hesse and by the countries France, Luxembourg and Belgium.

Rhineland-Palatinate was established in 1946 after World War II, from parts of the former states of Prussia (part of its Rhineland and Nassau provinces), Hesse (Rhenish Hesse) and Bavaria (its former outlying Palatinate kreis or district), by the French military administration in Allied-occupied Germany. Rhineland-Palatinate became part of the Federal Republic of Germany in 1949 and shared the country's only border with the Saar Protectorate until the latter was returned to German control in 1957. Rhineland-Palatinate's natural and cultural heritage includes the extensive Palatinate winegrowing region, picturesque landscapes, and many castles and palaces.

Rhineland-Palatinate is currently the only federal state in Germany where nuclear weapons are stored extraterritorially under the responsibility and supervision of US forces.

History

The state of Rhineland-Palatinate was founded shortly after the Second World War, on 30 August 1946. The Joint German-Luxembourg Sovereign Region is the only unincorporated area of the state of Rhineland-Palatinate. This condominium is formed by the rivers Moselle, Sauer, and Our, where they run along the border between Luxembourg and Rhineland-Palatinate or the Saarland.

Emergence 
The present state of Rhineland-Palatinate formed part of the French Zone of Occupation (1945–1949) after the Second World War.

On 10 July 1945, the occupation authority on the soil of the present-day Rhineland-Palatinate transferred from the Americans to the French. To begin with, the French divided the region provisionally into two "upper presidiums", Rhineland-Hesse-Nassau (for the hitherto Prussian government districts and regions of Koblenz, Trier, and Montabaur) and Hesse-Palatinate (for the hitherto Bavarian Palatinate and old Hessian-Darmstadt province of Rhenish Hesse). The formation of the state was ordained on 30 August 1946, the last state in the Western Zone of Occupation to be established, by Regulation No. 57 of the French military government under General Marie-Pierre Kœnig. It was initially called Rhenish-Palatinate ( or ); the name Rhineland-Palatinate was first confirmed in the constitution of 18 May 1947.

The provisional French government at that time wanted originally to leave the option open of annexing further areas west of the Rhine after the Saarland was turned into a protectorate. When the Americans and British, however had led the way with the establishment of German states, the French came under increasing pressure and eventually followed their example by setting up the states of Baden, Württemberg-Hohenzollern, and Rhineland-Palatinate. However the French military government forbade the Saarland from joining Rhineland-Palatinate. Mainz was named as the state capital in the regulation; the "Mixed Commission", named as the highest organ of state charged with the administration of the new state and with the preparation of an advisory state assembly, started its work in Mainz. However war damage and destruction meant that Mainz did not have enough administrative buildings, so the headquarters of the state government and parliament was provisionally established in Koblenz. On 22 November 1946, the constituent meeting of the Advisory State Assembly took place there, and a draft constitution was drawn up. Previously, local elections had been held.

Early years 
Adolf Süsterhenn submitted to the Advisory State Assembly a draft constitution, which was passed after several rounds of negotiation on 25 April 1947 in a final vote, with the absolute majority of the CDU voting for and the SPD and KPD voting against. A point of contention involved the draft constitution providing for separate schools based on Christian denomination. On 18 May 1947, 53% of the electorate adopted the Constitution for Rhineland-Palatinate in a referendum. While the Catholic north and west of the new state adopted the constitution by a majority, the majority in Rhenish Hesse and the Palatinate voted against it. On the same date the first elections took place for the state parliament, the Landtag of Rhineland-Palatinate. The inaugural assembly of parliament took place on 4 June 1947 in the large city hall at Koblenz. Wilhelm Boden was elected the first minister-president of Rhineland-Palatinate. Just one month later, Peter Altmeier succeeded him.

The constitutional bodies -the Government, the Parliament and the Constitutional Court – established their provisional seat in Koblenz. In the following period, Koblenz and Mainz each emphasized their suitability as the state capital in a public debate. From the beginning, Minister-President Altmeier pressed for Mainz as the capital because he knew that the south of the country, especially the Palatinate, would not accept Koblenz, which was far to the north and formerly Prussian.
After the government and parliament moved to Mainz, many state authorities and courts remained in Koblenz, including the Constitutional Court and the State Archives. In addition, the German Federal Archives and Federal Office of Hydrology were established in Koblenz in 1952.

Consolidation 
A sense of community developed only very gradually in the "land of the retort", which had been established largely without regard to the historical affiliations of its inhabitants. It was given little chance of survival, especially as it had very few large industrial centres. However, the establishment of numerous military bases, both Allied and Bundeswehr, helped to some extent to boost the economy. In 1956, under Article 29 of the Basic Law for the Federal Republic of Germany, petitions were made in the regions of Koblenz, Trier, Montabaur, Rhenish Hesse, and Palatinate for their separation from the state and incorporation into the respective states of North Rhine-Westphalia, Hesse, Bavaria, and Baden-Württemberg. All petitions for a referendum except those in the administrative district of Palatinate won the necessary majority; however, almost 20 years passed before the referendums finally took place. On 19 January 1975, none of the regions concerned returned a majority for being transferred to another state. This put an end to decades of discussion. Only the AKK conflict, a dispute over the districts of Mainz-Amöneburg, Mainz-Kastel, and Mainz-Kostheim, has continued to exercise politicians up to the present day.

Geography

Rhineland-Palatinate shares international borders with France (Grand Est), Luxembourg (Clervaux, Diekirch, Echternach, Grevenmacher, Remich, and Vianden), and Belgium (Wallonia). Within Germany, its neighbours are Baden-Württemberg, Hesse, North Rhine-Westphalia, and the Saarland. It is the ninth-largest state by area. Rhineland-Palatinate is part of the SaarLorLux euregion.

With 42% of its area covered by forests, it is the most forested state along with Hesse. The state's major rivers are the Rhine, including the UNESCO World Heritage Site Middle Rhine, and the Moselle. Several crater lakes of volcanic origin are in the Eifel, the largest of which is the Laacher See.

Climatically, Rhineland-Palatinate can be divided into two areas:
The Rhenish Massif with a typically humid continental climate (Dfb). Summers here are usually warm with much precipitation and winters tend to be dry and cold. Snowfall is a common occasion.

The deep Valleys of Rhine and Moselle with an oceanic climate (Köppen climate classification: Cfb), very closely bordering a humid subtropical climate (Köppen climate classification: Cfa). Summers are hot and moist, while winters are mild. Freezing temperatures are rare and snow usually melts within hours. The mild climate allows palm trees, fig trees, oleander shrubs, olive trees and other exotic plants to grow in this area.

The Rhenish Massif forms roughly the northern half of the state, including the regions Eifel, Moselle Valley, Hunsrück, Westerwald, and parts of the Taunus. The Palatinate forms the biggest part of the southern half along with Rhenish Hesse. The Nahe Valley separates both parts.

Politics

Administration
Rhineland-Palatinate is divided into 24 districts (Landkreise), 12 independent cities (Kreisfreie Städte).

Districts 
Listing with Vehicle registration plates of Germany

 Ahrweiler (AW)
 Altenkirchen (Westerwald) (AK)
 Alzey-Worms (AZ)
 Bad Dürkheim (DÜW)
 Bad Kreuznach (KH)
 Bernkastel-Wittlich (WIL, BKS)
 Birkenfeld (BIR)
 Cochem-Zell (COC, ZEL)
 Donnersbergkreis (KIB, ROK)
 Eifelkreis Bitburg-Prüm (BIT, PRÜ)
 Germersheim (GER)
 Kaiserslautern (KL)
 Kusel (KUS)
 Mainz-Bingen (MZ, BIN)
 Mayen-Koblenz (MYK, MY)
 Neuwied (NR)
 Rhein-Hunsrück-Kreis (SIM, GOA)
 Rhein-Lahn-Kreis (EMS, DIZ, GOH)
 Rhein-Pfalz-Kreis (RP)
 Südliche Weinstraße (SÜW)
 Südwestpfalz (PS, ZW)
 Trier-Saarburg (TR, SAB)
 Vulkaneifel (DAU)
 Westerwaldkreis (WW)

Independent cities 
Listing with Vehicle registration plates of Germany

 Frankenthal (Pfalz) (FT)
 Kaiserslautern (KL)
 Koblenz (KO)
 Landau in der Pfalz (LD)
 Ludwigshafen am Rhein (LU)
 Mainz (MZ)
 Neustadt an der Weinstraße (NW)
 Pirmasens (PS)
 Speyer (SP)
 Trier (TR)
 Worms (WO)
 Zweibrücken (ZW)

Demographics

Largest cities

The following table shows the ten largest cities of Rhineland-Palatinate:

Vital statistics

Births from January–August 2016 =  24,871
Births from January–August 2017 =  24,784
Deaths from January–August 2016 =  30,572
Deaths from January–August 2017 =  32,167
Natural growth from January–August 2016 =  -5,701
Natural growth from January–August 2017 =  -7,383

Religion
, 40.3% of the population of the state adhered to the Roman Catholic Church and 26.8% to the Evangelical Church in Germany; 32.9% of the population is irreligious or adheres to other religions. Muslims made up 5.0% of the total.

Jewish culture
The league of ShUM-cities in the later Rhineland-Palatinate comprised the Jewish communities of Mainz, Speyer, and Worms, which became the center of Jewish life during medieval times. The Takkanot Shum, or Enactments of ShU"M were a set of decrees formulated and agreed upon over a period of decades by their Jewish community leaders. Today, there are approximately 20,000 Jews (0.5% of the population) living in the state.

Economy
The gross domestic product (GDP) of the state was 147.0 billion euros in 2018, accounting for 4.4% of German economic output. GDP per capita adjusted for purchasing power was 33,100 euros or 110% of the EU27 average in the same year. The GDP per employee was 102% of the EU average.

Industry
Rhineland-Palatinate leads all German states with an export rate around 50%. Important sectors are the winegrowing, chemical, pharmaceutical, and auto parts industries. "Distinctive regional industries" includes gemstones, ceramics and glass, and leather. Small and medium enterprises are considered the "backbone" of the economy in Rhineland-Palatinate. The principal employer is the chemical and plastics processing industry, which is represented by BASF in Ludwigshafen. Boehringer, BioNTech, Joh. A. Benckiser, SGE Deutsche Holding, and Schott Glassworks conclude the top five companies in the state.

Agriculture and viticulture
Rhineland-Palatinate is Germany's leading producer of wine in terms of grape cultivation and wine export.

Of 13 wine regions producing quality wine in Germany, six (and ) are located in Rhineland-Palatinate, with 65 to 70% of the production of wine grapes in Germany having their origin within the state. About 13,000 wine producers generate 80 to 90% of the German wine export. The total estimated production from the six Rhineland-Palatinate regions was nearly 7 million hectoliters in 2018.

Traditional grape varieties and a wide range of varieties developed during the last 125 years are characteristic for the region.

In addition, Chardonnay as white varieties and Regent and St. Laurent as red varieties have been increasing their share, as the growing conditions improve in Rhineland-Palatinate.

The state supports the wine industry by providing a comprehensive consultancy and education program in the service supply centers of the land. The Geilweilerhof Institute for Grape Breeding is fully financed by the state.

The worldwide leader in sparkling wine production, producing 224,4 million bottles in 2017/18, is the renowned  Group. This company is headquartered in Trier, with operations in several locations in Rhineland-Palatinate and 3 sites in France (Compagnie Française des Grands Vins (CFGV)).

Unemployment 
The unemployment rate stood at 4.1% in October 2018 and was lower than the German average.

See also

 Butterpfad

References

Further reading
 Kreuz – Rad – Löwe, Rheinland-Pfalz und seine Geschichte, Verlag Philipp von Zabern, Mainz 2012
Band 1 (Von den Anfängen der Erdgeschichte bis zum Ende des Alten Reiches): 
Bände 2 (Vom ausgehenden 18. Jahrhundert bis ins 21. Jahrhundert) und 3 (Historische Statistik):

External links

 Official governmental portal
 

 
1946 establishments in Germany
States and territories established in 1946
History of the Palatinate (region)
NUTS 1 statistical regions of the European Union
Wine regions of Germany
States of Germany